Emilio Rentería García (born October 9, 1984) is a Venezuelan footballer who currently plays as a forward for Academia Puerto Cabello.

Career

Club
Rentería began his professional career in Spain, where he competed in the Spanish second division with Levante UD from 2001 to 2004. He then returned to his homeland to compete in the Venezuelan first division, first with Deportivo Italia, where he scored 12 goals during the 2004–2005 season. Rentería then joined UA Maracaibo, where he totaled 14 goals in two seasons (2005–2007), while also helping lead his side to two appearances in the Copa Libertadores, the most prestigious club competition in South America.

Rentería played for Caracas FC of the Venezuelan top flight from 2007 to 2009. He tallied 16 goals in that span, while once again helping his club to two appearances in Copa Libertadores, including a run to the quarterfinals in 2009, the club's best-ever finish in that competition.

Rentería joined Columbus Crew on August 19, 2009, and made his first appearance for the Black and Gold on September 20, 2009, playing the final three minutes of a league match against the Chicago Fire. During 2010/2011 Renteria was able to break into the starting 11 and prove his worth for the Columbus Crew. His first goal of the season came on May 20, 2010 versus the NY Red Bulls when he stole a pass to defender Tim Ream and scored unassisted. On July 17, 2010, Renteria scored yet another goal in Columbus Crew's match against Red Bulls during a 2–0 victory. Renteria ended the Crew's 245-minute scoreless streak in the 20th minute. On July 24, 2010, Renteria scored a gift goal in the first half versus Houston Dynamo.  Renteria's contract was not picked up following the 2012 season.

On 21 February 2013, Rentería signed a new contract with Uruguayan side Defensor Sporting.

International
Rentería has also represented the Venezuela National Team at the Under-17, U-20, U-23 and Senior levels, totaling 19 total goals at the youth levels and three goals with the senior team in friendly matches.

Honours
Levante
Segunda División: 2003–04

References

External links
 
 
 

1984 births
Living people
Association football forwards
Chilean Primera División players
Carabobo F.C. players
Caracas FC players
Columbus Crew players
Defensor Sporting players
Deportivo Italia players
Expatriate footballers in Chile
Expatriate footballers in Spain
Expatriate soccer players in the United States
Expatriate footballers in Uruguay
Atlético Levante UD players
Levante UD footballers
Major League Soccer players
Ñublense footballers
San Marcos de Arica footballers
Footballers from Caracas
UA Maracaibo players
Venezuela international footballers
Venezuela under-20 international footballers
Venezuela youth international footballers
Venezuelan expatriate footballers
Venezuelan expatriate sportspeople in the United States
Venezuelan expatriate sportspeople in Chile
Venezuelan expatriate sportspeople in Spain
Venezuelan expatriate sportspeople in Uruguay
Venezuelan footballers
Venezuelan Primera División players
Academia Puerto Cabello players